Fly By Wire is the fifth full-length studio album from American indie pop band Someone Still Loves You Boris Yeltsin. It was released through Polyvinyl Records on September 17, 2013.

Track listing
 "Harrison Ford" – 3:30
 "Young Presidents" – 2:59
 "Cover All Sides" – 3:06
 "Lucky Young" – 3:57
 "Ms. Dot" – 2:32
 "Loretta" – 2:40
 "Unearth" – 2:47
 "Bright Leaves" – 2:16
 "Nightwater Girlfriend" – 3:23
 "Fly By Wire" – 4:57

Personnel
The band members are credited as follows.

Will Knauer
Jonathan James
Philip Dickey

Additional musicians
Grace Bentley - vocals on Bright Leaves, co-writer on Young Presidents and Harrison Ford
Roni Dickey - clarinet on Loretta, organ on Bright Leaves
Brook Linder - vocals on Young Presidents, Harrison Ford, and Loretta
Mizuki Takahashi - ambient sounds on Fly By Wire

Production
Produced by Someone Still Loves You Boris Yeltsin.
Recording done from February to April 2013 in the attic on Weller Street in Springfield, Missouri.
Mixed by Sonny Diperri at Octopus Break.
Mastered by Carl Saff.

References

Someone Still Loves You Boris Yeltsin albums
2013 albums